Peng Yubin, Peng Yu-pin, (彭毓斌), (1900–1945), was a Nationalist Chinese general.

Military history
In 1936 Peng led the 1st Cavalry Division in the Suiyuan campaign.

In 1940 he was made Commanding General of the 1st Provisional Division.

In around September 1945, Peng Yubin lead the 23rd Army, the 83rd Army and other divisions totalling more than 20,000 men in the Shangdang Campaign. His force was ambushed and destroyed in October 1945 and Peng was killed at Siting.

Sources 

Chinese people of World War II
Military personnel of the Republic of China in the Second Sino-Japanese War
Military personnel of the Republic of China killed in the Second Sino-Japanese War
1945 deaths
Year of birth missing